The Analogue Nt is a home video game console designed and manufactured by Analogue Inc., designed to play games for the Nintendo Entertainment System and the Famicom.

History
In March, 2014 the system was announced. Analogue began accepting pre-orders for the system on May 5th, 2014.

Pre-orders began shipping in June of 2015.

A limited run of 10 24 karat gold plated special edition systems were produced by April 2016, and were available for sale at a price of $4999.

In 2016 Analogue announced a followup system, the Nt mini, a smaller model which includes RGB & HDMI output in the base model and uses an FPGA as a processor.

By July 23, 2017 the Analogue Nt had been discontinued.

Hardware
Instead of software emulation or an FPGA, the original Analogue Nt uses parts sourced from damaged Famicom HVC-001 systems. In particular the system incorporates a Ricoh 2A03 CPU and an NTSC Ricoh 2c02 PPU, on a custom printed circuit board. A notable original chip which was omitted included the lockout chip used on the NES. The system was designed to be compatible with NES, Famicom, and Famicom Disk System titles.

The default model was released with RGB (RGB, Component, S-Video, Composite, VGA, and SCART) video outputs, with an additional "add-on" for 1080p HDMI output and other digital features. 

The Analogue Nt's enclosure is solid aluminium unibody enclosure manufactured from 6061 aluminium in China, and assembled in the United States of America. Casing could be anodized red, blue, or black for an additional fee.

Reception
The Analogue Nt received positive reviews, with critics praising performance on HD TVs, while noting an unusually high price for the system. Will Greenwald's PCMag review gave the Analogue Nt a 4/5, praising the graphical output of the system as "simply the best-looking direct feed of an NES cartridge I've ever seen.", while noting that the price of the console with HDMI output was "tough-to-swallow". Vice praised the Analogue Nt's build quality and video quality saying, "the Analogue Nt is a gorgeous machine...The Analogue Nt makes NES games look phenomenal.", while also noting that NES games may have limited appeal to gamers not nostalgic for them. CNET.com said "In an age where retro games just don't look right on modern HDTVs, the Analogue Nt is a magical piece of hardware." while noting that "At $500 dollars the Analogue Nt is obviously not for everyone." The high price of the system was noted by many, such as Kyle Orland of Ars Technica, who noted that "it's hard to recommend to anyone besides the most committed 8-bit retro gaming addict".

External Links
 Website (Archived)

References

Unlicensed Nintendo Entertainment System hardware clones
Home video game consoles
2015 in video gaming
Products introduced in 2015
2010s in video gaming
Analogue (company) products
Regionless game consoles
Discontinued video game consoles